Rolinda is a small unincorporated agricultural community in Fresno County, California, United States. It is located along State Route 180. The community is in area code 559. It does not have its own ZIP code and mail uses the Fresno ZIP code of 93706.

Land surrounding the small community is mostly irrigated, la Thompson seedless grapevines used for Raisin and agricultural land. Row crops include feed crops such as alfalfa. It is common to see cattle egrets patrolling the fields for insect life. Raptors including red-shouldered hawks are also widely visible during daylight hours.

A landmark south of town is the Houghton-Kearney Elementary School, 8905 W. Kearney Blvd., o preceded by the Houghton School at 9128 W Whitesbridge Road where the old bus barn still stands closed in 1953 operated by the K-12 Central Unified School District. A post office operated at Rolinda from 1895 to 1902.

References

Unincorporated communities in California
Unincorporated communities in Fresno County, California